Ponca City High School is a public high school that serves approximately 1,500 students in grades 9–12, located in Ponca City, Oklahoma. The current main principal is Thad Dilbeck. The school operates on a semester schedule. Students attend six, 55-minute periods daily and also attend a 40-minute MUST (Mandatory Uninterrupted Study Time) period daily. A minimum of 46 credits is required for graduation. Ponca City High School students are called "Wildcats," a title that means hard work, perseverance, and extreme loyalty to the school, embodied by the school mascot "Willie" the Wildcat.

Notable alumni
Hub Andrews, professional baseball player
Douglas Blubaugh, Olympic Wrestling Gold Medal winner, 1960
Don Nickles, United States Senator from Oklahoma.
Jake McNiece, World War II paratrooper and leader of the Filthy Thirteen
Mike Thompson, baseball player
Lara Teeter, Tony Award nominee
Anthony Taylor, Roman Catholic Bishop
Shelby Wilson, Olympic Wrestling Gold Medal winner, 1960
Richard E. Killblane, military historian and author
Candy Loving, 25th Anniversary Playboy Playmate

References

Public high schools in Oklahoma
Schools in Kay County, Oklahoma